This page details the match results and statistics of the Afghanistan women's national football team.

Afghanistan women's national football team is the representative of the Afghanistan in international women's association football, It is governed by the Afghanistan Football Federation (AFF) and it competes as a member of the Asian Football Confederation (AFC).

the national team's first activity was in 2010 when they participated in the inaugural edition of the SAFF Women's Championship. the afghans were drawn alongside Nepal, Pakistan and Maldives. losing their first-ever match against Nepal (13–0) led to Afghanistan finishing last after losing the second match against Pakistan and drawing the Maldives in the last game. the team is currently unranked by FIFA after the team got inactive for more than 4 years. the team officially disbanded in August 2021 after the Taliban's takeover. which caused the women's national football team players to flee to western countries in the hope to escape with their life. some of the football players regrouped in Australia where the team came back to pitch unofficially.

Record per opponent
Key

The following table shows Afghanistan' all-time official international record per opponent:

Results

2010

2012

2013

2014

2016

2018

2021

2022

See also
Afghanistan national football team results
Melbourne Victory FC AWT
Women's football in Afghanistan

References

External links
 Afghanistan results on The Roon Ba
 Afghanistan results on Flashscore
 Afghanistan results on soccerway

2010s in Afghanistan
2020s in Afghanistan
Women's national association football team results
Results
Women's results